The Rachel Kilpatrick Purdy House is a historic house in Beatrice, Nebraska. It was built in 1915 for Rachel Kilpatrick as a wedding gift from her father, and designed in the Prairie School style by architect Richard W. Grant. It remained in the Kilpatrick family until 1925. It has been listed on the National Register of Historic Places since November 8, 2006.

References

		
National Register of Historic Places in Gage County, Nebraska
Prairie School architecture in Nebraska
Houses completed in 1915
1915 establishments in Nebraska